Judith Ann Jamison (pronounced JAM-ih-son) (born May 10, 1943) is an American dancer and choreographer. She is the artistic director emerita of Alvin Ailey American Dance Theater.

Early training
Judith Jamison was born in 1943 to Tessie Brown Jamison and John Jamison Sr. and grew up in Philadelphia, Pennsylvania, with her parents and older brother. Her father taught her to play the piano, and violin. She was exposed to the prominent art culture in Philadelphia from a very early age. At the age of six, she began her dance training at Judimar School of Dance. There she studied with Marion Cuyjet who became one of Jamison's early mentors. Under Cuyjet's tutelage, Jamison studied classical ballet, and modern dance. The Judimar studios were treated as a "holy place" and there was always a sense of performance and theatricality in Cuyjet's classes. By the age of eight, Jamison began dancing on pointe and started taking classes in tap, acrobatics, and Dunham technique (which was referred to as "primitive").

A few years later, Cuyjet began sending Jamison to other teachers to advance her dance education. She learned the Cechetti method from Antony Tudor, founder of the Philadelphia Ballet Guild, and studied with Delores Brown Abelson, a graduate of Judimar who pursued a performance career in New York City before returning to Philadelphia to teach. Throughout high school, Jamison was also member of numerous sports organizations, the Glee Club, and the Philadelphia String Ensemble. She studied Dalcroze Eurhythmics, a system that teaches rhythm through movement.

At the age of 17, Jamison graduated from Judimar and began her collegiate studies at Fisk University. After three semesters there, she transferred to the Philadelphia Dance Academy (now the University of the Arts) where she studied dance with James Jamieson, Nadia Chilkovsky, and Yuri Gottschalk. In addition to her technique classes, she took courses in Labanotation, kinesiology, and other dance studies. During this time, she also learned the Horton technique from Joan Kerr, which required great strength, balance, and concentration.

In 1992, Jamison was inducted into Delta Sigma Theta sorority as an honorary member.

Performance career
In 1964, after seeing Jamison in a master class, Agnes de Mille invited her to come to New York to perform in a new work that she was choreographing for American Ballet Theatre, The Four Marys. Jamison immediately accepted the offer and spent the next few months working with the company. When the performances ended and she found herself in New York without a job, Jamison attended an audition held by Donald McKayle. She felt that she performed very poorly in the audition and claimed, "I felt as if I had two left feet." However, a few days later, a friend of McKayle's, Alvin Ailey, called Jamison to offer her a place in his company – Alvin Ailey Dance Theater.

Jamison made her premiere with Alvin Ailey Dance Theater at Chicago's Harper Theater Dance Festival in 1965 in Congo Tango Palace, and in 1966, she toured Europe and Africa with the company. Jamison had always had a strong interest in African identity; therefore, traveling to Africa with the company and having the opportunity to observe the culture first-hand was an exciting and valuable experience for her. Unfortunately, soon afterward, financial complications forced Ailey to put his company on a temporary hiatus. During this time, Jamison danced with Harkness Ballet and served as an assistant to the artistic director. However, she immediately returned to Alvin Ailey Dance Theater when the company re-formed in 1967. Jamison spent the next thirteen years dancing with Alvin Ailey Dance Theater and learned over seventy ballets. "With Ailey`s troupe, Jamison did many U.S. State Department tours of Europe, going behind the Iron Curtain as well as into Asia and Turkey. She danced quite a bit in Germany, which she says became her "second home". Throughout her performance career with the company she danced in many of Ailey's most renowned works, including Blues Suite and Revelations.

On May 4, 1971, Jamison premiered the famous solo, Cry. Alvin Ailey choreographed this sixteen-minute dance as a birthday present for his mother, Lula Cooper, and later dedicated it to "all-black women everywhere, especially our mothers." The solo is intensely physical and emotionally draining to perform. It celebrates the journey of a woman coming out of a troubled and painful world and finding the strength to overcome and conquer. She never ran the full piece from start to finish until the premiere, the piece received standing ovations and overwhelming critical acclaim, rewarding Jamison with great fame and recognition throughout the dance world. Today, Cry remains a crowd favorite and is still featured in the company's repertoire.

Throughout her years with Alvin Ailey Dance Theater, Jamison continued to perform all over the world. Along with her work with Ailey's company, she also appeared as a guest artist with the Cullberg Ballet, Swedish Royal Ballet, San Francisco Ballet, and numerous other companies. She danced alongside many renowned dancers, including the ballet legend Mikhail Baryshnikov, in a duet entitled Pas de Duke, choreographed by Alvin Ailey in 1976. Finally, in 1980, she left Ailey's company to perform in the Broadway musical, Sophisticated Ladies. It was Jamison's first stage experience outside the realm of concert dance, and she admits it was initially very challenging for her. It was a completely different performance atmosphere and required a variety of new skills.

The Jamison Project
In addition to performing, Jamison wanted the opportunity to explore working with her own group of dancers. She began teaching master classes at Jacob's Pillow in 1981 and soon began choreographing her own works. She later formed The Jamison Project with a group of dancers with a strong desire to work and learn. The Project premiered on November 15, 1988, at the Joyce Theater in New York City, performing works such as Divining, Time Out, and Tease. Jamison later invited guest choreographers, including Garth Fagan, to set work for the company.

Return to Alvin Ailey Dance Theater
In 1988, Jamison returned to Alvin Ailey Dance Theater as an artistic associate. Upon Ailey's death, on December 1, 1989, she assumed the role of artistic director and dedicated the next 21 years of her life to the company's success. Alvin Ailey Dance Theater continued to thrive as Jamison continued to rehearse and restage classics from the company's repertory, as well as commission distinguished choreographers to create new works for the dancers. Jamison also continued to choreograph, and created dances such as Forgotten Time, Hymn, Love Stories, and Among Us for the company. In July 2011, Jamison transitioned into the role of artistic director emerita and appointed Robert Battle to the position of artistic director designate.

Personal life
Judith Jamison was married briefly to Miguel Godreau, a dancer with the Alvin Ailey Dance Theater, from 1972 to 1974, when the marriage was annulled.

Choreography by Jamison
Jamison represents women as strong and self-reliant in her choreography.

Divining (1984)
Forgotten Time (1989)
Rift (1991)
Hymn (a tribute to Alvin Ailey) (1993)
Riverside (1995)
Sweet Release (1996)
Echo: Far From Home (1998)
Double Exposure (2000)
Here...Now (2001)
Love Stories (in collaboration with Robert Battle and Rennie Harris) (2004)
Reminiscin''' (2005)Among Us (Private Spaces: Public Places) (2009)

WritingDancing Spirit, Jamison's autobiography, was published by Doubleday in 1993.

Awards
Candace Award, Arts, National Coalition of 100 Black Women (1990)
Golden Plate Award of the American Academy of Achievement (1992)
Youngest person ever to receive The Dance USA Award (1998)
New York State Governor's Arts Award (1998)
Kennedy Center Honors for her contribution to American culture through dance (1999)
A prime time Emmy Award and an American Choreography Award for her work on the PBS Documentary "A Hymn for Alvin Ailey" (1999)
National Medal of Arts (2001)
Honored by the National Theater of Ghana (2002)
The Paul Robeson Award from the Actors' Equity Association (2004)
Bessie Award for her commitment to development in dance and the arts (2007)
Honorary degree of Brown University in Fine Arts (2008)
The BET Honors Award – a tribute to the achievement of leading African Americans (2009)
Listed in the TIME 100: The World's Most Influential People (2009)
Congressional Black Caucus' Phoenix Award (2010)
The Handel Medallion (2010)
 BET Black Girls Rock - Living Legend Award (2018)

References

Further reading

External links

Alvin Ailey American Dance Theater biography
PBS "Great Performances" biography
Meet the Masters: Judith Jamison, 1/23/2011 Kennedy Center video interview

 Interviews on February 21, 1992, December 10, 1998 and July 3, 2008

Archival footage of Judith Jamison performing Scene Seen in 1988 at Jacob's Pillow
Judith Jamison  Video produced by Makers: Women Who Make America''

Living people
1943 births
American female dancers
Harkness Ballet dancers
Dancers from Pennsylvania
American choreographers
United States National Medal of Arts recipients
Primetime Emmy Award winners
Fisk University alumni
Kennedy Center honorees
African-American female dancers
African-American ballet dancers
African-American choreographers
University of the Arts (Philadelphia) alumni
Artists from Philadelphia
21st-century African-American people
21st-century African-American women
20th-century African-American people
20th-century African-American women